Kontoor Brands is an American clothing company. It was a spin off from the VF Corporation in May 2019, and markets denim clothing under the Lee, Wrangler and Rock & Republic brand names. Kontoor Brands also operates the VF Outlet chain of factory outlet stores. Its head office is in Greensboro, North Carolina.

Stock in the company is traded on the New York Stock Exchange under the symbol KTB; market capitalisation in 2020 was about $2.2 billion.

References 

Clothing companies of the United States
Companies listed on the New York Stock Exchange
Companies based in Greensboro, North Carolina
Multinational companies headquartered in the United States